The High Sign is a 1921 two-reel silent comedy film starring Buster Keaton, and written and directed by Keaton and Edward F. Cline. Its runtime is 21 minutes. Although One Week (1920) was Keaton's first independent film short released, The High Sign was the first one made. Disappointed with the result, Keaton shelved it and the film wasn't released until the following year. The title refers to the secret hand signal used by the film's underworld gang.

Plot 
Keaton plays a drifter who cons his way into working at an amusement park shooting gallery. Believing Keaton is an expert marksman, both the murderous gang the Blinking Buzzards and the man they want to kill end up hiring him. The film ends with a wild chase through a house filled with secret passages and trap doors.

Cast
 Buster Keaton - Our Hero (as 'Buster' Keaton)
 Bartine Burkett - Miss Nickelnurser (uncredited)
 Ingram B. Pickett - Tiny Tim (tall villain) (uncredited)
 Charles Dorety - Drunk (uncredited)
 Al St. John - Man in target practice (uncredited)

Production

The High Sign was Keaton's first independent production. In contrast to the "violent slapstick" of the films he had made with Fatty Arbuckle, this short film evinces the "dry and quiet comedy style" which would become Keaton's trademark.

The climactic chase scenes inside the house take place on a split-level, cutaway set with revolving wall panels, trap doors, and hidden corridors in all the rooms. Filming took place at the studios of the Comique Film Corporation recently vacated by Arbuckle. Keaton also began working with Arbuckle's former cinematographer Elgin Lessley and technical director Fred Gabourie, who remained with him until he signed with MGM in 1929.

Release
Though Keaton completed The High Sign a year earlier, he delayed its release because he felt it too closely mimicked Arbuckle's style; he also "thought the gags were too ridiculous and clever for their own sake". The High Sign was released April 4, 1921. At that time, Keaton had broken his ankle while filming the first version of The Electric House and his company needed to market a new film.

Contemporary soundtracks
Guitarist Bill Frisell released a soundtrack to the film in 1995 on his album The High Sign/One Week. The Rats & People Motion Picture Orchestra premiered its new score for the film in 2008. Carl Davis composed an original score in 2017.

See also
 List of American films of 1921
 Buster Keaton filmography

References

Sources

External links

 Senses of Cinema article on The High Sign 
 
 The 'High Sign' on YouTube
 The High Sign at the International Buster Keaton Society
 
 

1921 films
Films directed by Buster Keaton
Films directed by Edward F. Cline
American silent short films
American black-and-white films
1921 comedy films
1921 short films
Silent American comedy films
Films produced by Joseph M. Schenck
Films with screenplays by Buster Keaton
Articles containing video clips
1920s American films